Marie Davidson (born 1987) is a French-Canadian electronic musician and producer from Montreal.

Career
Davidson was part of the duo Les Momies de Palerme, along with Xarah Dion. Their album, Brûlez ce coeur, was released on Constellation Records in 2010. She has collaborated with various other musicians including Matana Roberts (on her project Coin Coin Chapter One: Gens de couleur libres) and David Kristian, and she was part of the orchestral project Land of Kush.

She is also one half of the minimal wave duo Essaie pas, a duo she formed with her partner, Pierre Guerineau. The duo were longlisted for the 2016 Polaris Music Prize for their album Demain est une autre nuit.

Her third solo album, Adieux au dancefloor, was named by Pitchfork as one of "The 20 Best Electronic Albums of 2016". The album is themed around Davidson's ambivalent feelings towards dance music and club culture. She released Working Class Woman on Ninja Tune in 2018. She released Renegade Breakdown on Ninja Tune in 2020.

Musical style
Davidson's music has been labelled as techno and minimal wave, with AllMusic's Paul Simpson describing it as "cold, hypnotic minimal wave with analog synthesizers and drum machines, showcasing her intimate yet detached lyrics that are more often spoken than sung." Pitchfork critic Sophie Kemp has stated that the sound of Working Class Woman is "somewhere between spoken word electroclash of Miss Kittin and the dreamy dissonance of Julee Cruise."

Discography
Studio albums
 Perte d'identité (2014)
 Un autre voyage (2015)
 Adieux au dancefloor (2016)
 Working Class Woman (2018)
Renegade Breakdown (2020)

References

External links
 Marie Davidson at Ninja Tune

Canadian record producers
Singers from Montreal
French-language singers of Canada
Living people
1987 births
21st-century Canadian women singers
Canadian women record producers
Canadian techno musicians
Minimal wave musicians
Canadian women in electronic music
Félix Award winners